Oxydia is a genus of moths in the family Geometridae first described by Achille Guenée in 1857.

Species
Oxydia vesulia (Cramer, 1779)
Oxydia cubana (Warren, 1906)
Oxydia gueneei (Warren, 1906)
Oxydia nimbata Guenée, 1857
Oxydia mundata Guenée, 1857
Oxydia masthala Druce, 1892

References

Ourapterygini